Opa! is a 2005 film directed by Udayan Prasad and starring Matthew Modine.

It was shot in Greece.

Plot

Cast
Matthew Modine as Eric
Richard Griffiths as Tierney
Alki David as Spyros Kakogiannis
Agni Scott as Katerina
Panayota Aravantzi as Agapoula
Eirini Koumarianou as Yaya Adriana  
Christos Valavanidis  as Mayor 
Shuler Hensley as Big Mac McLaren

Reception
On review aggregator website Rotten Tomatoes, the film holds an approval rating of 9% based on reviews from 11 critics, with an average rating of 4.3/10.

References

External links

2005 comedy films
Films scored by Stephen Warbeck
Films produced by Elliott Kastner
Films shot in Greece
2000s English-language films
Films directed by Udayan Prasad